Go Soo (born October 4, 1978), also known as Ko Soo, is a South Korean actor. He has appeared in television series such as Piano, Green Rose and Will It Snow for Christmas?, as well as the films White Night and The Front Line.

Early life and education 
Go was born and raised in Nonsan, South Chungcheong Province, South Korea as the youngest of 2 sons. He attended college in Sangmyung University, Cheonan campus, where he majored in Cinema degree.

Career

1998–2005: Debut and breakout fame 
When Go Soo first came to Seoul, he acted on stage, but he lacked money that time. Since he lacked money, he decided to put his stage acting on hold for later and eventually stopped. From then on, he began presenting his profile photo to numerous agencies. Go first appeared in a soft drink TV commercial, followed by a role as an extra in the 1998 music video "Last Promise" by the band Position. He made his television debut in 1999 through the MBC sitcoms My Funky Family and Jump and KBS2 drama series Ad Madness.
Go drew critical praise for his performance in the television drama Piano in 2001, with one review describing him as an "actor with precision".

Go made his big screen debut as a drug crime officer in 2004's Some, in which he performed his own stunts and was later recognized as Best New Actor at the Grand Bell Awards. Go reunited with Ad Madness co-star Park Ye-jin in TV series When A Man Loves A Woman in the same year.
In 2005, he starred in the revenge drama Green Rose, which was shot on location in China and Korea. He played a simple man who falls in love with a rich woman and gets accused of a crime he did not commit. Then in the romantic comedy Marrying a Millionaire, Go played a delivery man who is asked by a TV producer to act like a rich bachelor to attract several women on a televised reality dating show.

2006–2008: Military
Go began his two-year mandatory military service on March 2, 2006 and he was assigned as a Civil Service Personnel in Gangnam District, Seoul. He was discharged on April 25, 2008, and received recognition for being an outstanding Public Interest Service Personnel.

2009–present: Comeback
For his first post-army project, Go surprised fans by choosing a stage play. Invited to join the "Best Play Series" by veteran actor Cho Jae-hyun (Jo was his costar in Piano, and the senior colleague he "most respects"), Go made his theater debut as the lead actor in The Return of President Eom, which ran from May 23 to August 3, 2008.

In 2009, he starred in the dark mystery film White Night, based on the Japanese novel Byakuyakō by Keigo Higashino. Go said he was "completely absorbed by the intriguing storyline." Go then made his television comeback in the melodrama Will It Snow for Christmas?, a tale of rekindled childhood love penned by renowned TV writer Lee Kyung-hee. He described his character as "hurt by love and tries to overcome that pain."

His next film Haunters, in which he played the only man immune to a psychic's supernatural powers, was a box office hit in 2010.
On May 13, 2011, he signed under the management of Lee Byung-hun known as BH Entertainment. He next played a soldier in the Korean War-set The Front Line, then a grieving firefighter in the 2012 romance drama Love 911.

Afterwards, he collaborated with the makers of The Chaser for Empire of Gold, a TV series about the power struggle within a rich family living through Korea's turbulent economy of the 1990s, produced by SBS; in this series, he played an antihero. Later that year, he starred in melodrama film Way Back Home, playing the devastated husband of a woman wrongfully accused of drug smuggling. Go said the reason he chose the film was because he wanted to work with acclaimed actress Jeon Do-yeon, and that through his character he "was able to tackle the challenge of internal and external change".

In 2014, Go appeared in two short films. Directed by Kang Je-gyu, Awaiting is about a married couple separated for sixty years by the division of North and South Korea. Awaiting was one of the four short films comprising Beautiful 2014, an omnibus project that premiered at the 38th Hong Kong International Film Festival. Meanwhile, Myohyangsangwan ("View of Mount Myohyang"), which depicted the rendezvous of a South Korean painter and a North Korean waitress in a North Korean restaurant, is a collaboration by contemporary artists Moon Kyung-won and Jeon Joon-ho, and combined a theatrical plot, experimental imagery, dance and performance art. He then starred in the period film The Royal Tailor, in the role of an upstart new designer whose talent and instincts challenges the traditional master artisan of royal attire.

In June 2015, Go Soo has amicably parted ways with BH Entertainment, and joined a new agency founded by his previous manager at BH Entertainment.

Go made his small screen comeback after three years in MBC's 55th-founding anniversary historical drama directed by a famed director Lee Byung-hoon, The Flower in Prison.

In 2017, Go starred in Lucid Dream, a psychological thriller in which Go played a former journalist who attempts to find his kidnapped son using lucid dreaming. The same year, Go starred in The Tooth and the Nail, a film based on the 1955 mystery novel by Bill S. Ballinger in which a magician discovers the incinerated teeth and fingernails of his missing butler. He next starred in period epic film The Fortress, where he worked with his manager Lee Byung-hun.

In 2018, Go was cast in the medical drama Heart Surgeons as a cardiothoracic surgery resident trying to save his mother in need of a heart transplant.

Personal life
Go began dating Kim Hye-yeon, an art student eleven years his junior, shortly after meeting her in 2008. The couple married  on February 17, 2012 at the Shilla Hotel in Seoul. Their son was born on January 28, 2013, and their daughter was born on April 17, 2015. On September 13, 2017, his wife gave birth to their 3rd child.

Filmography

Film

Television series

Web shows

Music video appearances

Theater

Discography

Awards and nominations

References

External links 
 
 
 
 Go Soo at BH Entertainment 
 Go Soo Fan Club at Daum 
 Go Soo Japanese website 

21st-century South Korean male actors
South Korean male television actors
South Korean male film actors
South Korean male stage actors
People from Nonsan
1978 births
Living people